Radio Skye (formerly Cuillin FM) is a radio station which broadcasts from Portree on the Isle of Skye to the Isle of Skye, Lochalsh, Wester Ross on the Scottish mainland, but worldwide online via a livestream.

About
The station took its original name (Cuillin FM) from a mountain range on Skye, which also made up the background of the station's logo.

Programming

The station broadcasts live from their studio in Portree with daily breakfast and drivetime programmes along with regular news bulletins. The daily schedule is also filled with live and pre-recorded shows. The station has a duty to provide at least three hours of Gaelic programming per week. The Vodafone Big Top 40 is produced by Capital Radio at its Capital studio in London for broadcast on 140 local commercial radio stations across the UK.

Radio Skye also has outside broadcasting facilities for outdoor and on-location events such as shinty matches, The Highland Games, Piping and Music Festivals, agricultural shows and Youth Speaks.

The morning service from Portree Free Church is aired on Radio Skye between 2 pm and 3 pm each Sunday.

Breakfast Show
Radio Skye broadcasts a daily Breakfast Show (Monday to Friday) between 0730 and 0900.

Drivetime Show
The ‘Dol Dhachaigh’ drivetime show is broadcast live Monday to Friday from 1630 to 1800.

Local News
The station employs a Cultural Journalist alongside the station manager to develop local news stories that form part of regular bulletins during the daily schedule.

Awards
The station and presenters have been nominated for and received numerous awards at events such as the Community Radio Awards.

References

External links
 

Radio stations in Scotland
Mass media in Highland (council area)
Portree
Radio stations in the Highlands & Islands